Hysterocrates is a genus of African tarantulas that was first described by Eugène Louis Simon in 1892.

Species
 it contains 18 species and one subspecies, found in Africa:
Hysterocrates apostolicus Pocock, 1900 – São Tomé and Príncipe
Hysterocrates celerierae (Smith, 1990) – Ivory Coast
Hysterocrates crassipes Pocock, 1897 – Cameroon
Hysterocrates didymus Pocock, 1900 – São Tomé and Príncipe
Hysterocrates ederi Charpentier, 1995 – Equatorial Guinea (Bioko)
Hysterocrates efuliensis (Smith, 1990) – Cameroon
Hysterocrates elephantiasis (Berland, 1917) – Congo
Hysterocrates gigas Pocock, 1897 – Cameroon
Hysterocrates greeffi (Karsch, 1884) – Cameroon
Hysterocrates greshoffi (Simon, 1891) (type) – Congo
Hysterocrates hercules Pocock, 1900 – Nigeria
Hysterocrates laticeps Pocock, 1897 – Cameroon
Hysterocrates maximus Strand, 1906 – Cameroon
Hysterocrates ochraceus Strand, 1907 – Cameroon, Congo
Hysterocrates robustus Pocock, 1900 – Equatorial Guinea (Mbini)
Hysterocrates r. sulcifer Strand, 1908 – Cameroon
Hysterocrates scepticus Pocock, 1900 – São Tomé and Príncipe
Hysterocrates sjostedti (Thorell, 1899) – Cameroon
Hysterocrates weileri Strand, 1906 – Cameroon

In synonymy
H. ochraceus congonus Strand, 1919 = Hysterocrates ochraceus

Nomina dubia
Hysterocrates affinis angusticeps Strand, 1907 - Cameroon
Hysterocrates affinis Strand, 1907 - Cameroon
Hysterocrates haasi Strand, 1906 - Cameroon
Hysterocrates spellenbergi Strand, 1906 - Cameroon
Hysterocrates vosseleri Strand, 1906 - West Africa

Transferred to other genera
 Hysterocrates minimus Strand, 1907 → Phoneyusa minima (Nomen dubium)
 Hysterocrates severini Strand, 1920 → Phoneyusa bidentata

See also
 List of Theraphosidae species

References

Theraphosidae genera
Spiders of Africa
Theraphosidae